Desertone Halt railway station served Disertowen and Magheramason, County Londonderry in Northern Ireland.

It was opened by the Donegal Railway Company on 1 May 1908.

It closed on 1 January 1955.

Routes

References

Disused railway stations in County Londonderry
Railway stations opened in 1908
Railway stations closed in 1955
1908 establishments in Ireland
Railway stations in Northern Ireland opened in the 20th century